The Golden Harp (Dutch: Gouden Harp) is awarded annually to Dutch musicians for their entire oeuvre. Golden Harps have been awarded 42 times. 149 different persons or (musical) groups have had the honour of receiving the award which is considered to be one of the most important prizes in Dutch music.

Background 

The awards were first presented in 1962.

The prize is intended for a musician's entire oeuvre. The website of Buma Cultuur states the following: "Considered for this award are persons who have made themselves particularly meritorious for Dutch light music throughout their careers."

Apart from 1963 and 1964 award ceremonies were held every year since the first presentation in 1962. The winners are selected by a different jury each year, usually in February. Buma Cultuur also presents the Zilveren Harp award, which is given to promising Dutch musical talent and the Buma Export Award for acts which are successful abroad.

List of winners

Notes

 The phrase "Considered for this award are persons who have made themselves particularly meritorious for Dutch light music throughout their careers." is a translation of the Dutch phrase "Voor de Gouden Harp komen personen in aanmerking die zich gedurende hun carrière op bijzondere wijze verdienstelijk hebben gemaakt voor de Nederlandse lichte muziek."
 Cor Lemaire and Wim Ibo returned their awards in response to the eleventh edition in 1975 after a Gouden Harp had been awarded to Mary Servaes-Bey (better known by her stage name Zangeres Zonder Naam).
 Received award posthumously.

See also 
 Zilveren Harp
 List of music awards

References 

General
 List of winners Gouden Harp at Alles op een rij.nl
  Encyclopædia of Dutch rock and Pop music at Pop Instituut.nl
Specific

External links 
 Buma Cultuur

Dutch music awards
Awards established in 1962